Aurora College is a state coeducational Year 7–13 secondary school located in Invercargill, New Zealand.

It is New Zealand's southernmost stand-alone secondary school, and second southernmost secondary school after The Catlins Area School in Owaka.

History
Aurora College opened in 2005, although it has a history extending back to 1912. It was formed from the merger of Mt Anglem College and Tweedsmuir Junior High School, on the former Mt Anglem site. Mt Anglem College had operated for only six years, having opened in 1999 following the merger of Kingswell and Cargill High Schools on the existing Kingswell site. Cargill High School was the successor school to Southland College (formerly Southland Technical College) after the latter site become part of Southland Polytechnic in 1978. Kingswell High School, which was established in 1971, was built to the S68 plan which is characterised by single-storey classroom blocks of concrete block construction, with low-pitched roofs and internal open courtyards.

Notable staff
Notable staff of Aurora College or its predecessor institutions include:
 Jack Alabaster, cricketer and educator
 Austin Brookes, mountaineer and educator
 William (Bill) James Reed, artist

Notable alumni

People educated at Aurora College or its predecessor institutions include:
 Rex Austin, politician
 Johnny Checketts, World War II air ace
 Simon Culhane, rugby union player
 Ruth Dallas, writer and poet
 Bill Kini, boxer
 Jean McKenzie, diplomat
 Trevor Moffitt, artist
 Mils Muliaina, rugby union player
 Cliff Skeggs, businessman and politician
 Jeff Wilson, rugby union player and cricketer

References

External links

Schools in Invercargill
Secondary schools in Southland, New Zealand
New Zealand secondary schools of S68 plan construction
Educational institutions established in 2005
2005 establishments in New Zealand